Tourism is travel for pleasure or business, and the commercial activity of providing and supporting such travel.  The World Tourism Organization defines tourism more generally, in terms which go "beyond the common perception of tourism as being limited to holiday activity only", as people "travelling to and staying in places outside their usual environment for not more than one consecutive year for leisure and not less than 24 hours, business and other purposes". Tourism can be domestic (within the traveller's own country) or international, and international tourism has both incoming and outgoing implications on a country's balance of payments.

Tourism numbers declined as a result of a strong economic slowdown (the late-2000s recession) between the second half of 2008 and the end of 2009, and in consequence of the outbreak of the 2009 H1N1 influenza virus, but slowly recovered until the COVID-19 pandemic put an abrupt end to the growth. The United Nations World Tourism Organization estimated that global international tourist arrivals might decrease by 58% to 78% in 2020, leading to a potential loss of US$0.9–1.2 trillion in international tourism receipts.

Globally, international tourism receipts (the travel item in balance of payments) grew to  trillion ( billion) in 2005, corresponding to an increase in real terms of 3.8% from 2010. International tourist arrivals surpassed the milestone of 1 billion tourists globally for the first time in 2012. Emerging source markets such as China, Russia, and Brazil had significantly increased their spending over the previous decade.

Global tourism accounts for  8% of global greenhouse-gas emissions. Emissions as well as other significant environmental and social impacts are not always beneficial to local communities and their economies. For this reason, many tourist development organizations have begun to focus on sustainable tourism to mitigate the negative effects caused by the growing impact of tourism. The United Nations World Tourism Organization emphasized these practices by promoting tourism as part of the Sustainable Development Goals, through programs like the International Year for Sustainable Tourism for Development in 2017, and programs like Tourism for SDGs focusing on how SDG 8, SDG 12 and SDG 14 implicate tourism in creating a sustainable economy.

Tourism has reached new dimensions with the emerging industry of space tourism as well as the current industry with cruise ships, there are many different ways of tourism. Another potential new tourism industry is virtual tourism.

Etymology

The English-language word tourist was used in 1772 and tourism in 1811. These words derive from the word tour, which comes from Old English , from Old French , from Latin  - "to turn on a lathe", which is itself from Ancient Greek  - "lathe".

Definitions
In 1936, the League of Nations defined a foreign tourist as "someone traveling abroad for at least twenty-four hours". Its successor, the United Nations, amended this definition in 1945, by including a maximum stay of six months.

In 1941, Hunziker and Kraft defined tourism as "the sum of the phenomena and relationships arising from the travel and stay of non-residents, insofar as they do not lead to permanent residence and are not connected with any earning activity." In 1976, the Tourism Society of England's definition was: "Tourism is the temporary, short-term movement of people to destinations outside the places where they normally live and work and their activities during the stay at each destination. It includes movements for all purposes." In 1981, the International Association of Scientific Experts in Tourism defined tourism in terms of particular activities chosen and undertaken outside the home.

In 1994, the United Nations identified three forms of tourism in its Recommendations on Tourism Statistics:
Domestic tourism, involving residents of the given country traveling only within this country
 Inbound tourism, involving non-residents traveling in the given country
 Outbound tourism, involving residents traveling in another country

Other groupings derived from the above grouping:
 National tourism, a combination of domestic and outbound tourism
 Regional tourism, a combination of domestic and inbound tourism
 International tourism, a combination of inbound and outbound tourism

The terms tourism and travel are sometimes used interchangeably. In this context, travel has a similar definition to tourism but implies a more purposeful journey. The terms tourism and tourist are sometimes used pejoratively, to imply a shallow interest in the cultures or locations visited. By contrast, traveller is often used as a sign of distinction. The sociology of tourism has studied the cultural values underpinning these distinctions and their implications for class relations.

Tourism products
According to the World Tourism Organization, a tourism product is:

Tourism product covers a wide variety of services including:
 Accommodation services from low-cost homestays to five-star hotels
 Hospitality services including food and beverage serving centers
 Health care services like massage
 All modes of transport, its booking and rental
 Travel agencies, guided tours and tourist guides
 Cultural services such as religious monuments, museums, and historical places
 Shopping

International tourism

International tourism is tourism that crosses national borders. Globalisation has made tourism a popular global leisure activity. The World Tourism Organization defines tourists as people "traveling to and staying in places outside their usual environment for not more than one consecutive year for leisure, business and other purposes". The World Health Organization (WHO) estimates that up to 500,000 people are in flight at any one time.

In 2010, international tourism reached US$919B, growing 6.5% over 2009, corresponding to an increase in real terms of 4.7%. In 2010, there were over 940 million international tourist arrivals worldwide. By 2016 that number had risen to 1,235 million, producing 1,220  billion USD in destination spending. The COVID-19 crisis had significant negative effects on international tourism significantly slowing the overall increasing trend.

International tourism has significant impacts on the environment, exacerbated in part by the problems created by air travel but also by other issues, including wealthy tourists bringing lifestyles that stress local infrastructure, water and trash systems among others.

Basis
The economic foundations of tourism are essentially the cultural assets, the cultural property and the nature of the travel location. The World Heritage Sites are particularly worth mentioning today because they are real tourism magnets. But even a country's current or former form of government can be decisive for tourism. For example, the fascination of the British royal family brings millions of tourists to Great Britain every year and thus the economy is around £550 million a year. The Habsburg family can be mentioned in Central Europe. According to estimates, the Habsburg brand should generate tourism sales of 60 million euros per year for Vienna alone. The tourist principle "Habsburg sells" applies.

Tourism typically requires the tourist to feel engaged in a genuine experience of the location they are visiting. According to Dean MacCannell, tourism requires that the tourist can view the toured area as both authentic and different from their own lived experience. By viewing the "exotic," tourists learn what they themselves are not: that is, they are "un-exotic," or normal.

According to MacCannell, all modern tourism experiences the "authentic" and "exotic" as "developmentally inferior" to the modern—that is, to the lived experience of the tourist.

History

Ancient
Travel outside a person's local area for leisure was largely confined to wealthy classes, who at times travelled to distant parts of the world, to see great buildings and works of art, learn new languages, experience new cultures, enjoy pristine nature and to taste different cuisines. As early as Shulgi, however, kings praised themselves for protecting roads and building way stations for travellers. Travelling for pleasure can be seen in Egypt as early on as 1500 BC. Ancient Roman tourists during the Republic would visit spas and coastal resorts such as Baiae. They were popular among the rich. Numerous villas were located in Campania, around Rome and in the northern part of the Adriatic as in Barcola near Trieste. Pausanias wrote his Description of Greece in the second century AD. In ancient China, nobles sometimes made a point of visiting Mount Tai and, on occasion, all five Sacred Mountains.

Medieval
By the post-classical era, many religions, including Christianity, Buddhism, and Islam had developed traditions of pilgrimage. The Canterbury Tales (c. 1390s), which uses a pilgrimage as a framing device, remains a classic of English literature, and Journey to the West (c. 1592), which holds a seminal place in Chinese literature, has a Buddhist pilgrimage at the center of its narrative.

In medieval Italy, Petrarch wrote an allegorical account of his 1336 ascent of Mont Ventoux that praised the act of travelling and criticized  (a 'cold lack of curiosity'); this account is regarded as one of the first known instances of travel being undertaken for its own sake. The Burgundian poet  later composed his own horrified recollections of a 1430 trip through the Jura Mountains.

In China, 'travel record literature' became popular during the Song Dynasty (960–1279). Travel writers such as Fan Chengda (1126–1193) and Xu Xiake (1587–1641) incorporated a wealth of geographical and topographical information into their writing, while the 'daytrip essay' Record of Stone Bell Mountain by the noted poet and statesman Su Shi (1037–1101) presented a philosophical and moral argument as its central purpose.

Grand Tour

Modern tourism can be traced to what was known as the Grand Tour, which was a traditional trip around Europe (especially Germany and Italy), undertaken by mainly upper-class European young men of means, mainly from Western and Northern European countries. In 1624, the young Prince of Poland, Ladislaus Sigismund Vasa, the eldest son of Sigismund III, embarked on a journey across Europe, as was in custom among Polish nobility. He travelled through territories of today's Germany, Belgium, the Netherlands, where he admired the siege of Breda by Spanish forces, France, Switzerland to Italy, Austria, and the Czech Republic. It was an educational journey and one of the outcomes was introduction of Italian opera in the Polish–Lithuanian Commonwealth.

The custom flourished from about 1660 until the advent of large-scale rail transit in the 1840s and generally followed a standard itinerary. It was an educational opportunity and rite of passage. Though primarily associated with the British nobility and wealthy landed gentry, similar trips were made by wealthy young men of Protestant Northern European nations on the Continent, and from the second half of the 18th century some South American, US, and other overseas youth joined in. The tradition was extended to include more of the middle class after rail and steamship travel made the journey easier, and Thomas Cook made the "Cook's Tour" a byword.

The Grand Tour became a real status symbol for upper-class students in the 18th and 19th centuries. In this period, Johann Joachim Winckelmann's theories about the supremacy of classic culture became very popular and appreciated in the European academic world. Artists, writers, and travellers (such as Goethe) affirmed the supremacy of classic art of which Italy, France, and Greece provide excellent examples. For these reasons, the Grand Tour's main destinations were to those centers, where upper-class students could find rare examples of classic art and history.

The New York Times recently described the Grand Tour in this way:

The primary value of the Grand Tour, it was believed, laid in the exposure both to the cultural legacy of classical antiquity and the Renaissance, and to the aristocratic and fashionably polite society of the European continent.

Emergence of leisure travel

Leisure travel was associated with the Industrial Revolution in the United Kingdomthe first European country to promote leisure time to the increasing industrial population. Initially, this applied to the owners of the machinery of production, the economic oligarchy, factory owners and traders. These comprised the new middle class. Cox & Kings was the first official travel company to be formed in 1758.

The British origin of this new industry is reflected in many place names. In Nice, France, one of the first and best-established holiday resorts on the French Riviera, the long esplanade along the seafront is known to this day as the Promenade des Anglais; in many other historic resorts in continental Europe, old, well-established palace hotels have names like the Hotel Bristol, Hotel Carlton, or Hotel Majesticreflecting the dominance of English customers.

A pioneer of the travel agency business, Thomas Cook's idea to offer excursions came to him while waiting for the stagecoach on the London Road at Kibworth. On 5 July 1841, Thomas Cook arranged for the rail company to charge one shilling per person; this included rail tickets and food for the journey. Cook was paid a share of the fares charged to the passengers, as the railway tickets, being legal contracts between company and passenger, could not have been issued at his own price. This was the first privately chartered excursion train to be advertised to the general public; Cook himself acknowledged that there had been previous, unadvertised, private excursion trains. During the following three summers he planned and conducted outings for temperance societies and Sunday school children. In 1844, the Midland Counties Railway Company agreed to make a permanent arrangement with him, provided he found the passengers. This success led him to start his own business running rail excursions for pleasure, taking a percentage of the railway fares.

In 1855, he planned his first excursion abroad, when he took a group from Leicester to Calais to coincide with the Paris Exhibition. The following year he started his "grand circular tours" of Europe. During the 1860s he took parties to Switzerland, Italy, Egypt, and the United States. Cook established "inclusive independent travel", whereby the traveller went independently but his agency charged for travel, food, and accommodation for a fixed period over any chosen route. Such was his success that the Scottish railway companies withdrew their support between 1862 and 1863 to try the excursion business for themselves.

Significance of tourism 
The tourism industry, as part of the service sector, has become an important source of income for many regions and even for entire countries. The Manila Declaration on World Tourism of 1980 recognized its importance as "an activity essential to the life of nations because of its direct effects on the social, cultural, educational, and economic sectors of national societies, and on their international relations."

Tourism brings large amounts of income into a local economy in the form of payment for goods and services needed by tourists, accounting  for 30% of the world's trade in services, and, as an invisible export, for 6% of overall exports of goods and services. It also generates opportunities for employment in the service sector of the economy associated with tourism. It is also claimed that travel broadens the mind.

The hospitality industries which benefit from tourism include transportation services (such as airlines, cruise ships, transits, trains and taxicabs); lodging (including hotels, hostels, homestays, resorts and renting out rooms); and entertainment venues (such as amusement parks, restaurants, casinos, festivals, shopping malls, music venues, and theatres). This is in addition to goods bought by tourists, including souvenirs.

On the flip-side, tourism can degrade people and sour relationships between host and guest. Tourism frequently also puts additional pressure on the local environment.

The economic foundations of tourism are essentially the cultural assets, the cultural property and the nature of the travel location. The World Heritage Sites are particularly worth mentioning today because they are real tourism magnets. But even a country's current or former form of government can be decisive for tourism. For example, the fascination of the British royal family brings millions of tourists to Great Britain every year and thus the economy around £550 million a year. The Habsburg family can be mentioned in Central Europe. According to estimates, the Habsburg brand should generate tourism sales of 60 million euros per year for Vienna alone. The tourist principle "Habsburg sells" applies.

Tourism, cultural heritage and UNESCO

Cultural and natural heritage are in many cases the absolute basis for worldwide tourism. Cultural tourism is one of the megatrends that is reflected in massive numbers of overnight stays and sales. As UNESCO is increasingly observing, the cultural heritage is needed for tourism, but also endangered by it. The "ICOMOS - International Cultural Tourism Charter" from 1999 is already dealing with all of these problems. As a result of the tourist hazard, for example, the Lascaux cave was rebuilt for tourists. Overtourism is an important buzzword in this area. Furthermore, the focus of UNESCO in war zones is to ensure the protection of cultural heritage in order to maintain this future important economic basis for the local population. And there is intensive cooperation between UNESCO, the United Nations, the United Nations peacekeeping and Blue Shield International. There are extensive international and national considerations, studies and programs to protect cultural assets from the effects of tourism and those from war. In particular, it is also about training civilian and military personnel. But the involvement of the locals is particularly important. The founding president of Blue Shield International Karl von Habsburg summed it up with the words: "Without the local community and without the local participants, that would be completely impossible'.

Cruise shipping

Cruising is a popular form of water tourism. Leisure cruise ships were introduced by the Peninsular & Oriental Steam Navigation Company (P&O) in 1844, sailing from Southampton to destinations such as Gibraltar, Malta and Athens. In 1891, German businessman Albert Ballin sailed the ship Augusta Victoria from Hamburg into the Mediterranean Sea. 29 June 1900 saw the launching of the first purpose-built cruise ship was Prinzessin Victoria Luise, built in Hamburg for the Hamburg America Line.

Modern day tourism
Many leisure-oriented tourists travel to seaside resorts on their nearest coast or further afield. Coastal areas in the tropics are popular in both summer and winter.

Mass tourism

Academics have defined mass tourism as travel by groups on pre-scheduled tours, usually under the organization of tourism professionals. This form of tourism developed during the second half of the 19th century in the United Kingdom and was pioneered by Thomas Cook. Cook took advantage of Europe's rapidly expanding railway network and established a company that offered affordable day trip excursions to the masses, in addition to longer holidays to Continental Europe, India, Asia and the Western Hemisphere which attracted wealthier customers. By the 1890s over 20,000 tourists per year used Thomas Cook & Son.

The relationship between tourism companies, transportation operators and hotels is a central feature of mass tourism. Cook was able to offer prices that were below the publicly advertised price because his company purchased large numbers of tickets from railroads. One contemporary form of mass tourism, package tourism, still incorporates the partnership between these three groups.

Travel developed during the early 20th century and was facilitated by the development of the automobiles and later by airplanes.
Improvements in transport allowed many people to travel quickly to places of leisure interest so that more people could begin to enjoy the benefits of leisure time.

In Continental Europe, early seaside resorts included: Heiligendamm, founded in 1793 at the Baltic Sea, being the first seaside resort; Ostend, popularised by the people of Brussels; Boulogne-sur-Mer and Deauville for the Parisians; Taormina in Sicily. In the United States, the first seaside resorts in the European style were at Atlantic City, New Jersey and Long Island, New York.

By the mid-20th century, the Mediterranean Coast became the principal mass tourism destination. The 1960s and 1970s saw mass tourism play a major role in the Spanish economic "miracle".

In the 1960s and 1970s, scientists discussed negative socio-cultural impacts of tourism on host communities. Since the 1980s the positive aspects of tourism began to be recognized as well.

Niche tourism

Niche tourism refers to the numerous specialty forms of tourism that have emerged over the years, each with its own adjective. Many of these terms have come into common use by the tourism industry and academics. Others are emerging concepts that may or may not gain popular usage. Examples of the more common niche tourism markets are:

 Agritourism
 Birth tourism
 Culinary tourism
 Cultural tourism
 Dark tourism (also called "black tourism" or "grief tourism")
 Eco tourism
 Extreme tourism
 Geotourism
 Heritage tourism
 LGBT tourism
 Medical tourism
 Film tourism
 Nautical tourism
 Pop-culture tourism
 Religious tourism
 Sex tourism
 Slum tourism
 Sports tourism
 Virtual tourism
 War tourism
 Wellness tourism
 Wildlife tourism

Other terms used for niche or specialty travel forms include the term "destination" in the descriptions, such as destination weddings, and terms such as location vacation.

Winter tourism

St. Moritz, Switzerland became the cradle of the developing winter tourism in the 1860s: hotel manager Johannes Badrutt invited some summer guests from England to return in the winter to see the snowy landscape, thereby inaugurating a popular trend. It was, however, only in the 1970s when winter tourism took over the lead from summer tourism in many of the Swiss ski resorts. Even in winter, up to one third of all guests (depending on the location) consist of non-skiers.

Major ski resorts are located mostly in the various European countries (e.g. Andorra, Austria, Bulgaria, Bosnia and Herzegovina, Croatia, Czech Republic, Cyprus, Finland, France, Germany, Greece, Iceland, Italy, Norway, Latvia, Lithuania, Poland, Romania, Serbia, Sweden, Slovakia, Slovenia, Spain, Switzerland, Turkey), Canada, the United States (e.g. Montana, Utah, Colorado, California, Wyoming, Vermont, New Hampshire, New York) Argentina, New Zealand, Japan, South Korea, Chile, and Lebanon.

Recent developments
There has been an up-trend in tourism over the last few decades, especially in Europe, where international travel for short breaks is common. Tourists have a wide range of budgets and tastes, and a wide variety of resorts and hotels have developed to cater for them. For example, some people prefer simple beach vacations, while others want more specialized holidays, quieter resorts, family-oriented holidays, or niche market-targeted destination hotels.

The developments in air transport infrastructure, such as jumbo jets, low-cost airlines, and more accessible airports have made many types of tourism more affordable. A major factor in the relatively low cost of air travel is the tax exemption for aviation fuels. The WHO estimated in 2009 that there are around half a million people on board aircraft at any given time. There have also been changes in lifestyle, for example, some retirement-age people sustain year-round tourism. This is facilitated by internet sales of tourist services. Some sites have now started to offer dynamic packaging, in which an inclusive price is quoted for a tailor-made package requested by the customer upon impulse.

There have been a few setbacks in tourism, such as the September 11 attacks and terrorist threats to tourist destinations, such as in Bali and several European cities. Also, on 26 December 2004, a tsunami, caused by the 2004 Indian Ocean earthquake, hit the Asian countries on the Indian Ocean, including the Maldives. Thousands of people died including many tourists. This, together with the vast clean-up operations, stopped or severely hampered tourism in the area for a time.

Individual low-price or even zero-price overnight stays have become more popular in the 2000s, especially with a strong growth in the hostel market and services like CouchSurfing and airbnb being established. There has also been examples of jurisdictions wherein a significant portion of GDP is being spent on altering the primary sources of revenue towards tourism, as has occurred for instance in Dubai.

Sustainable tourism

Ecotourism

Ecotourism, also known as ecological tourism, is responsible travel to fragile, pristine, and usually protected areas that strives to be low-impact and (often) small-scale. It helps educate the traveller; provides funds for conservation; directly benefits the economic development and political empowerment of local communities, and fosters respect for different cultures and for human rights. Take only memories and leave only footprints is a very common slogan in protected areas. Tourist destinations are shifting to low carbon emissions following the trend of visitors more focused in being environmentally responsible adopting a sustainable behavior.

Volunteer tourism

Volunteer tourism (or voluntourism) is growing as a largely Western phenomenon, with volunteers travelling to aid those less fortunate than themselves in order to counter global inequalities. Wearing (2001) defines volunteer tourism as applying "to those tourists who, for various reasons, volunteer in an organised way to undertake holidays that might involve aiding or alleviating the material poverty of some groups in society". VSO was founded in the UK in 1958 and the US Peace Corps was subsequently founded in 1960. These were the first large scale voluntary sending organisations, initially arising to modernise less economically developed countries, which it was hoped would curb the influence of communism.

This form of tourism is largely praised for its more sustainable approach to travel, with tourists attempting to assimilate into local cultures, and avoiding the criticisms of consumptive and exploitative mass tourism. However, increasingly, voluntourism is being criticised by scholars who suggest it may have negative effects as it begins to undermine local labour, and force unwilling host communities to adopt Western initiatives, while host communities without a strong heritage fail to retain volunteers who become dissatisfied with experiences and volunteer shortages persist. Increasingly, organisations such as VSO have been concerned with community-centric volunteer programmes where power to control the future of the community is in the hands of local people.

Pro-poor tourism

Pro-poor tourism, which seeks to help the poorest people in developing countries, has been receiving increasing attention by those involved in development; the issue has been addressed through small-scale projects in local communities and through attempts by Ministries of Tourism to attract large numbers of tourists. Research by the Overseas Development Institute suggests that neither is the best way to encourage tourists' money to reach the poorest as only 25% or less (far less in some cases) ever reaches the poor; successful examples of money reaching the poor include mountain-climbing in Tanzania and cultural tourism in Luang Prabang, Laos. There is also the possibility of pro-poor tourism principles being adopted in centre sites of regeneration in the developed world.

Recession tourism

Recession tourism is a travel trend which evolved by way of the world economic crisis. Recession tourism is defined by low-cost and high-value experiences taking place at once-popular generic retreats. Various recession tourism hotspots have seen business boom during the recession thanks to comparatively low costs of living and a slow world job market suggesting travellers are elongating trips where their money travels further. This concept is not widely used in tourism research. It is related to the short-lived phenomenon that is more widely known as staycation.

Medical tourism

When there is a significant price difference between countries for a given medical procedure, particularly in Southeast Asia, India, Sri Lanka, Eastern Europe, Cuba and Canada where there are different regulatory regimes, in relation to particular medical procedures (e.g. dentistry), travelling to take advantage of the price or regulatory differences is often referred to as "medical tourism".

Educational tourism

Educational tourism is developed because of the growing popularity of teaching and learning of knowledge and the enhancing of technical competency outside of the classroom environment. Brent W. Ritchie, publisher of Managing Educational Tourism, created a study of a geographic subdivision to demonstrate how tourism educated high school students participating in foreign exchange programs over the last 15 years. In educational tourism, the main focus of the tour or leisure activity includes visiting another country to learn about the culture, study tours, or to work and apply skills learned inside the classroom in a different environment, such as in the International Practicum Training Program. In 2018, one impact was many exchange students traveled to America to assist students financially in order to maintain their secondary education.

Event tourism 
This type of tourism is focused on tourists coming into a region to either participate in an event or to see an organized event put on by the city/region. This type of tourism can also fall under sustainable tourism as well and companies that create a sustainable event to attend open up a chance to not only the consumer but their workers to learn and develop from the experience. Creating a sustainable atmosphere creates a chance to inform and encourage sustainable practices. An example of event tourism would be the music festival South by Southwest that is hosted in Austin, Texas annually. Every year people from all over the world flock to the city for one week to sit in on technology talks and see bands perform. People are drawn here to experience something that they are not able to experience in their hometown, which defines event tourism.

Creative tourism

Creative tourism has existed as a form of cultural tourism, since the early beginnings of tourism itself. Its European roots date back to the time of the Grand Tour, which saw the sons of aristocratic families travelling for the purpose of mostly interactive, educational experiences. More recently, creative tourism has been given its own name by Crispin Raymond and Greg Richards, who as members of the Association for Tourism and Leisure Education (ATLAS), have directed a number of projects for the European Commission, including cultural and crafts tourism, known as sustainable tourism. They have defined "creative tourism" as tourism related to the active participation of travellers in the culture of the host community, through interactive workshops and informal learning experiences.

Meanwhile, the concept of creative tourism has been picked up by high-profile organizations such as UNESCO, who through the Creative Cities Network, have endorsed creative tourism as an engaged, authentic experience that promotes an active understanding of the specific cultural features of a place. UNESCO wrote in one of its documents: "'Creative Tourism' involves more interaction, in which the visitor has an educational, emotional, social, and participative interaction with the place, its living culture, and the people who live there. They feel like a citizen." Saying so, the tourist will have the opportunity to take part in workshops, classes and activities related to the culture of the destination.

More recently, creative tourism has gained popularity as a form of cultural tourism, drawing on active participation by travellers in the culture of the host communities they visit. Several countries offer examples of this type of tourism development, including the United Kingdom, Austria, France, the Bahamas, Jamaica, Spain, Italy, New Zealand and South Korea.

The growing interest of tourists in this new way to discover a culture regards particularly the operators and branding managers, attentive to the possibility of attracting a quality tourism, highlighting the intangible heritage (craft workshops, cooking classes, etc.) and optimizing the use of existing infrastructure (for example, through the rent of halls and auditoriums).

Experiential tourism
Experiential travel (or "immersion travel") is one of the major market trends in the modern tourism industry. It is an approach to travelling which focuses on experiencing a country, city or particular place by connecting to its history, people, food and culture.

The term "experiential travel" has been mentioned in publications since 1985, but it was not discovered as a meaningful market trend until much later.

Dark tourism

One emerging area of special interest has been identified by Lennon and Foley (2000) as "dark" tourism. This type of tourism involves visits to "dark" sites, such as battlegrounds, scenes of horrific crimes or acts of genocide, for example concentration camps. Its origins are rooted in fairgrounds and medieval fairs.

Philip Stone argues that dark tourism is a way of imagining one's own death through the real death of others. Erik H Cohen introduces the term "populo sites" to evidence the educational character of dark tourism. Popular sites transmit the story of victimized people to visitors. Based on a study at Yad Vashem, the Shoah (Holocaust) memorial museum in Jerusalem, a new term—in populo—is proposed to describe dark tourism sites at a spiritual and population center of the people to whom a tragedy befell. Learning about the Shoah in Jerusalem offers an encounter with the subject which is different from visits to sites in Europe, but equally authentic. It is argued that a dichotomy between "authentic" sites at the location of a tragedy and "created" sites elsewhere is insufficient. Participants' evaluations of seminars for European teachers at Yad Vashem indicate that the location is an important aspect of a meaningful encounter with the subject. Implications for other cases of dark tourism at in populo locations are discussed. In this vein, Peter Tarlow defines dark tourism as the tendency to visit the scenes of tragedies or historically noteworthy deaths, which continue to impact our lives. This issue cannot be understood without the figure of trauma.

Victoria Mitchell et al. suggest that dark tourism seems to be a heterogeneous discipline. There is a great dispersion of definitions, knowledge production and meanings revolving around the term. In fact, dark tourism practices vary in culture and time. Qualitative speaking, dark tourism experience is pretty different from leisure practices. To fill the gap, the existent definitions should be catalogued in sub-categories to form an all-encompassing model that expands the current understanding of dark tourism. In consonance with this, M. Apleni et al. argue dark tourism helps the industry not to be fragmented before the ongoing states of crises the activity often faces. They cite the case of terrorism which paves the way for the construction of a new dark site. Dark tourism plays a leading role not only in enhancing destination resilience but also in helping communities to deal with traumatic experiences.

Social tourism
Social tourism is making tourism available to poor people who otherwise could not afford to travel for their education or recreation. It includes youth hostels and low-priced holiday accommodation run by church and voluntary organisations, trade unions, or in Communist times publicly owned enterprises. In May 1959, at the second Congress of Social Tourism in Austria, Walter Hunziker proposed the following definition: "Social tourism is a type of tourism practiced by low-income groups, and which is rendered possible and facilitated by entirely separate and therefore easily recognizable services".

Doom tourism

Also known as "tourism of doom," or "last chance tourism", this emerging trend involves travelling to places that are environmentally or otherwise threatened (such as the ice caps of Mount Kilimanjaro, the melting glaciers of Patagonia, or the coral of the Great Barrier Reef) before it is too late. Identified by travel trade magazine Travel Age West editor-in-chief Kenneth Shapiro in 2007 and later explored in The New York Times, this type of tourism is believed to be on the rise. Some see the trend as related to sustainable tourism or ecotourism due to the fact that a number of these tourist destinations are considered threatened by environmental factors such as global warming, overpopulation or climate change. Others worry that travel to many of these threatened locations increases an individual's carbon footprint and only hastens problems threatened locations are already facing.

Religious tourism

Religious tourism, in particular pilgrimage, can serve to strengthen faith and to demonstrate devotion. Religious tourists may seek destinations whose image encourages them to believe that they can strengthen the religious elements of their self-identity in a positive manner. Given this, the perceived image of a destination may be positively influenced by whether it conforms to the requirements of their religious self-identity or not.

DNA tourism 
DNA tourism, also called "ancestry tourism" or "heritage travel", is tourism based on DNA testing. These tourists visit their remote relatives or places where their ancestors came from, or where their relatives reside, based on the results of DNA tests. DNA tourism became a growing trend in 2019.

Impacts

Growth
The World Tourism Organization (UNWTO) forecasts that international tourism will continue growing at the average annual rate of 4%. With the advent of e-commerce, tourism products have become prominent traded items on the internet. Tourism products and services have been made available through intermediaries, although tourism providers (hotels, airlines, etc.), including small-scale operators, can sell their services directly. This has put pressure on intermediaries from both on-line and traditional shops.

It has been suggested there is a strong correlation between tourism expenditure per capita and the degree to which countries play in the global context. Not only as a result of the important economic contribution of the tourism industry, but also as an indicator of the degree of confidence with which global citizens leverage the resources of the globe for the benefit of their local economies. This is why any projections of growth in tourism may serve as an indication of the relative influence that each country will exercise in the future.

Space tourism

There has been a limited amount of orbital space tourism, with only the Russian Space Agency providing transport to date. A 2010 report into space tourism anticipated that it could become a billion-dollar market by 2030. The space market has been around since 1979, however, there has been a limited amount of orbital space tourism, with only the Russian Space Agency providing transport on its Soyuz and the Chinese Shenzhou being the only two spacecrafts suitable for human travel . In April 2001, Dennis Tito, a customer of the Russian Soyuz became the first tourist to visit space. In May 2011, Virgin Galactic launched its SpaceShipTwo plane that allows people to travel 2 hours space at the advertised price of $200,000 per seat. A challenge that the commercial space tourism industry faces is to be able to have fundings from private investments needed to lower the cost of access to space in addition to being able to encourage both private and public sector support to increase capacity to allow commercial passengers. With space tourism still being new concept, there are many factors that needs to be considered for the industry. From its actual demand to its risk factor to its liabilities and insurance issues, there are still a lot of research that needs to be conducted. A 2010 report into space tourism anticipated that the industry is expected to grow by 18% - 26% per year during 2020 to 2030.

Sports tourism

Since the late 1980s, sports tourism has become increasingly popular. Events such as rugby, Olympics, Commonwealth Games, Cricket World Cups and FIFA World Cups have enabled specialist travel companies to gain official ticket allocation and then sell them in packages that include flights, hotels and excursions.

Tourism security 
Tourism security is a subdiscipline of tourist studies that explores the factors that affect the ontological security of tourists. Risks are evaluated by their impact and nature. Tourism security includes methodologies, theories and techniques oriented to protect the organic image of tourist destinations. Three academic waves are significant in tourism security: risk perception theory, disaster management, and post-disaster consumption.

Andrew Spencer & Peter Tarlow argue that tourism security is not an easy concept to define. It includes a set of sub-disciplines, and global risks different in nature which cause different effects in the tourism industry. The rise of tourism security and safety as a consolidated discipline coincides with the globalization and ultimate maturation of the industry worldwide. Some threats include, for example, terrorist groups looking to destabilize governments affecting not only the local economies but killing foreign tourists to cause geopolitical tensions between delivery-country and receiving-tourist countries. Today, island destinations are more affected by terrorism and other global risks than other continent destinations

Trends since 2000 

As a result of the late-2000s recession, international arrivals experienced a strong slowdown beginning in June 2008. Growth from 2007 to 2008 was only 3.7% during the first eight months of 2008. This slowdown on international tourism demand was also reflected in the air transport industry, with negative growth in September 2008 and a 3.3% growth in passenger traffic through September. The hotel industry also reported a slowdown, with room occupancy declining. In 2009 worldwide tourism arrivals decreased by 3.8%. By the first quarter of 2009, real travel demand in the United States had fallen 6% over six quarters. While this is considerably milder than what occurred after the 9/11 attacks, the decline was at twice the rate, as real GDP has fallen.

However, evidence suggests that tourism as a global phenomenon shows no signs of substantially abating in the long term. Many people increasingly view vacations and travel as a necessity rather than a luxury, and this is reflected in tourist numbers recovering some 6.6% globally over 2009, with growth up to 8% in emerging economies.

Impacts of the COVID-19 pandemic 

In 2020 the COVID-19 pandemic lock-downs, travel bans and a substantial reduction in passenger travel by air and sea contributed to a sharp decline in tourism activity. The World Tourism Organization (WTO) reported a 70% decrease in international travel in 2020, where 165 of 217 worldwide destinations completely stopped international tourism by April 2020. Since every country imposes different travel restrictions, it makes traveling plans complicated and often too difficult to figure out, thus the willingness to travel for the general population decreases. It is estimated that the United States lost 147 billion U.S. dollars in revenue from tourism between January and October 2020. Spain had the next highest loss of revenue at around 46.7 billion U.S dollars, and countries in Africa collectively lost about 55 billion dollars during April and June 2020.

Negative impacts 
Nearly all sectors within the tourism industry were significantly impacted by the pandemic. Airlines had large losses of revenue due to reduced number of passenger with the International Air Transport Association (IATA) estimating airline revenue loss to be around $314 billion in 2020. There was a 80% reduction of flights compared to the year 2019. In the food industry, many restaurants had to close which caused a ripple-effect to its related industries such as food production, farming, shipping, etc. As for the hotel industry, by June 2020 most of the hotels rooms were empty throughout the United States of America.

Positive impacts 
Virtual tourism is an emerging market that is popularized as an alternative solutions to in person tourism during the pandemic. Since many places like museums want to restrict crowdedness, virtual tours are set up to still provide visitors the experience without posing any health risks. This creates new business models and provide new and inventive opportunities for the tourism industry. However, there is fear that virtual tourism cannot provide the same sensation for people if those activity were done in person.

See also

References

Bibliography

Further reading
 
 
 Antje Monshausen, Sustainable and development friendly In: D+C Vol.42.2015:4

External links

 

 
Articles containing video clips
1770s neologisms